Nikolaus Biewer (24 January 1922 – 16 November 1980) was a German footballer who played internationally for Saarland.

References

1922 births
1980 deaths
Association football defenders
Saar footballers
Saarland international footballers
1. FC Saarbrücken players
Place of birth missing